Yousef Casewit is an Egyptian Quranic scholar and assistant professor of Qur'anic Studies at the University of Chicago.

Biography
Yousef was born in Egypt and raised in Morocco, and has studied with Muslim intellectuals in Morocco, Syria, and Mauritania. He received his M.A., M.Phil., and Ph.D. in Islamic Studies from Yale University. Casewit worked as a Humanities Research Fellow at New York University Abu Dhabi and an Assistant Professor of Arabic intellectual heritage and culture at the American University of Sharjah before joining the Divinity School at the University of Chicago. He is proficient in Arabic, French, and Spanish.

Works
 The Mystics of Al-Andalus: Ibn Barrajān and Islamic Thought in the Twelfth Century (Winner of Iran World Book Award of the Year (2019)
 A Qurʾān Commentary by Ibn Barrajān of Seville (d. 536/1141): Wisdom Deciphered, the Unseen Discovered - Ῑḍāḥ al-Ḥikma bi-ʾAḥkām al-ʿIbra, co-edited with Gerhard Böwering, Brill, Tafsir Qurʾānic Studies Series (2015)
 Sufism Revived: A Contemporary Treatise on Divine Light, Prophecy, and Sainthood

See also
 Walid Ahmad Saleh

References

Quranic exegesis scholars
Year of birth missing (living people)
Living people
Egyptian emigrants to the United States
Yale Graduate School of Arts and Sciences alumni
University of Chicago faculty
Muslim scholars of Islamic studies